The 2001 Gujarat cyclone was the third strongest tropical cyclone, in terms of barometric pressure, to form in the Arabian Sea on record; only Cyclones Gonu in 2007 and Kyarr in 2019 were stronger. The storm originated from a tropical disturbance that formed east of Somalia on May 18. Over the following few days, the system gradually organized into a tropical depression. Tracking eastward, towards the coastline of southwestern India, the storm slowly intensified. Shortly before reaching shore, the system turned north and later west, away from land. After taking this turn, the storm intensified into a very severe cyclonic storm, attaining its peak intensity on May 24 with winds of 215 km/h (130 mph 3-minute winds) and a barometric pressure of 932 mbar (hPa). At the time, this ranked the cyclone as the strongest known storm in the Arabian Sea.

After stalling several hundred kilometres offshore, the storm weakened over cooler waters that it had upwelled. By May 27, the system weakened to a cyclonic storm and by this time was approaching the northwestern coastline of India, near Gujarat. The following day, the storm made landfall in the Saurashtra region as a deep depression with winds of 55 km/h (35 mph 3-minute winds). The depression quickly weakened after moving inland and dissipated early on May 29.

Although a powerful cyclone over water, the storm had relatively little impact over land. In the Valsad district, two coastal communities lost a combined 200 homes due to large swells produced by the storm. However, the losses were more extensive offshore. Between 120 and 900 fishermen were listed as missing after contact was lost with their vessels during the storm.

Meteorological history

The origins of the 2001 Gujarat cyclone can be traced to a tropical disturbance over the Arabian Sea on May 18. The following day, the system was determined to be relatively stationary near the island of Socotra. Although deep convection was associated with the disturbance, there was no evidence of a low-level circulation. By May 20, the disturbance slowly moved towards the southeast in response to an upper-level trough over India. The overall structure gradually improved as good outflow developed. A mid-level circulation finally developed late on May 21, prompting the Joint Typhoon Warning Center (JTWC) to issue a Tropical Cyclone Formation Alert. Several hours later, they began monitoring the system as a tropical depression with the identifier 01A; however, operational advisories were not issued until the cyclone was estimated to have attained tropical storm intensity. By the morning of May 22, the India Meteorological Department (IMD) also took notice of the system.

Additionally, a -wide eye developed within the center of circulation during this intensification phase. Throughout most of May 22, the strengthening slowed considerably as it paralleled the southwestern coast of India. Initially, it was feared that the storm would move inland as a powerful cyclone; however, a ridge over the northern Arabian Sea caused the storm to turn westward, back over open water. Once further away from land, the cyclone resumed intensification, becoming a rare, Category 3 equivalent storm by the morning of May 24.

At the time of peak intensity, the cyclone displayed a well-defined eye and excellent outflow. Although a powerful storm, it quickly weakened as conditions became hostile for tropical cyclone development. Strong wind shear tore convection away from the cyclone and caused it to become disorganized. The weakening trend lessened shortly thereafter but still continued. Operationally, the JTWC issued their final advisory on the cyclone on May 28 as it weakened to a tropical depression over open waters. The once powerful cyclone, now devoid of all convection, tracked towards the northwestern coast of India. During the afternoon of May 29, the cyclone rapidly regenerated as it made landfall in Gujarat. Not long after moving overland, the system rapidly weakened and dissipated over India within several hours.

Preparations and impact
Ahead of the storm, all ports in Gujarat, including Kandla, one of the largest in the country, were closed as a precautionary measure. On May 25, over 10,000 people were evacuated from coastal areas in the threatened region. Throughout India, a total of 118,800 people were evacuated and 100,000 more were evacuated in Pakistan. The Indian military was placed on standby to undertake search-and-rescue missions immediately after the storms' passage. Fourteen districts of Gujarat were placed on red alert, the highest level of preparedness. Seven emergency control centers were set up across the country and officials alerted hospitals and fire crews about the approaching storm.

Several relief agencies were already positioned in the region in response to a magnitude 7.7 earthquake in January of that year that killed over 20,000 people. Additional disaster relief teams were deployed to the region to further prepare residents for the cyclone. Food, water and other necessities were stored and ready to be provided to victims of the storm. Large swells produced by the storm affected a large portion of the western Indian coastline, especially in the city of Bombay. In the Valsad district, two coastal communities lost a combined 200 homes due to large swells produced by the storm. Offshore, between 1,500 and 2,000 fishing vessels had lost contact with the mainland. Later reports indicated that between 120 and 900 fishermen had gone missing as a result of the cyclone.

Records
This would have made the system the first recorded storm of that intensity on record in the Arabian Sea. However, in post-storm analysis, it was discovered that 1-minute winds did not exceed . The next storm to reach this intensity was Cyclone Gonu in 2007 North Indian Ocean cyclone season, which became the first known super cyclonic storm in the region. Upon attaining its peak intensity, the storm attained a barometric pressure of 932 mbar (hPa), the lowest in the region at the time. The cyclone was ranked as the strongest in the Arabian Sea for six years until it was surpassed by Gonu in 2007, which attained a minimum pressure of 920 mbar (hPa). Again it was surpassed to sixth place as Cyclone Kyarr, Cyclone Chapala, Cyclone Tauktae and Cyclone Nilofar surpassed it's windspeed intensity as they become category 4 tropical cyclones in later years. Now this cyclone is tied with Cyclone Megh for sixth strongest cyclone in Arabian Sea based on windspeed of one minute mean.

See also

2001 North Indian Ocean cyclone season
Cyclone Gonu
List of the most intense tropical cyclones

References

External links
India Meteorological Department
Joint Typhoon Warning Center 

Extremely severe cyclonic storms
India Cyclone, 2001
Tropical cyclones in India
Tropical cyclones in Pakistan
Tropical cyclones in 2001